Vic Seixas and Doris Hart successfully defended their title, defeating Enrique Morea and Louise Brough in the final, 8–6, 2–6, 6–3 to win the mixed doubles tennis title at the 1955 Wimbledon Championships.

Seeds

  Vic Seixas /  Doris Hart (champions)
  Enrique Morea /  Louise Brough (final)
  Ham Richardson /  Darlene Hard (fourth round)
  Lew Hoad /  Jenny Hoad (semifinals)

Draw

Finals

Top half

Section 1

Section 2

Section 3

Section 4

Bottom half

Section 5

Section 6

Section 7

Section 8

References

External links

X=Mixed Doubles
Wimbledon Championship by year – Mixed doubles